Wayne Koestenbaum (born 1958) is an American artist, poet, and cultural critic. He received a B.A. from Harvard University, an M.A. from the Johns Hopkins Writing Seminars, and a Ph.D. from Princeton University and is a 1994 Whiting Award recipient. He received an American Academy of Arts and Letters Award in Literature in 2020. He has published over 20 books to date.

Koestenbaum works as a Distinguished Professor of English, French, and Comparative Literature at the CUNY Graduate Center, where he taught poet, and teaches painting at Yale University. He lives and works in New York City.

Early life and education 
Koestenbaum was born and raised in San Jose, California. He is the son of writer Phyllis Koestenbaum and leadership consultant Peter Koestenbaum.

Koestenbaum lived in New York from 1984 to 1988 while a graduate student at Princeton University. He notes that his early years in New York as the period when he discovered opera, literature, and gay culture. Koestenbaum wrote book reviews for the New York Native and the Village Voice during these years.

From 1988 to 1997, Koestenbaum lived in New Haven, Connecticut.

Critical work

In Boston Review, Stefania Heim wrote that Koestenbaum's work —across genre— "obliterates any vestigial divide we might hold on to between play and thought. It revels in and broadcasts the risks and joys ( the risky joys and joyful risks) inherent in both." Koestenbaum's rhapsodic criticism—containing autobiographical asides, and characterized by an analytic attention to small details, an approach indebted to Roland Barthes's theory of the "punctum"—focuses on celebrity, performance, poetics, film, contemporary visual art, and queer sexuality. His best-known critical book, The Queen's Throat, is a rigorous exploration of a phenomenon frequently discussed casually but seldom considered from a scholarly viewpoint: the predilection of gay men for opera.  Koestenbaum's claim is that opera derives its power from a kind of physical sympathy between singer and audience that has as much to do with desire as with hearing.  He says of the act of listening:
The dance of sound waves on the tympanum, and the sigh I exhale in sympathy with the singer, persuade me that I have a body—if only by analogy, if only a second-best copy of the singer's body.  I'm a lemming, imprinted by the soprano, my existence an aftereffect of her crescendo.  (42)
Koestenbaum's conclusion is that gay men's affinity for opera tells us as much about opera and its inherent questions about masculinity as it does about homosexuality.

Humiliation, Koestenbaum's critically acclaimed disquisition on the meaning of humiliation (both personal and universal), was praised by John Waters as "the funniest, smartest, most heartbreaking yet powerful book I've read in a long time."  Koestenbaum starred in a web series in support of this book, "Dear Wayne, I've Been Humiliated...", which was dubbed "the mother of all book trailers" by The New York Observer.

Koestenbaum's 2012 book The Anatomy of Harpo Marx was met with mixed reviews. Brian Dillon praised the book in Sight and Sound as "charming and rigorous" and lauded the book in Frieze as an "excellent example of a kind of delirious scholarship." In New Haven Review, Jonathan Kiefer described the book as "a zesty and deeply literate joy to read. Just as his previous nonfiction work, Humiliation, seemed like an apotheosis of new literary possibility in the age of overshare, so Koestenbaum's new book reinvigorates film studies."'Writing in the San Francisco Chronicle, Saul Austerlitz suggested that Koestenbaum "sexualizes Harpo beyond all recognition, creating a figure about whom the author can say, in all seriousness, that 'courtesy of the anus, we can imagine, Marxist-style, a path away from family and state.'" Joe Queenan, citing Koestenbaum's claim that Harpo Marx "has many vaginas," wrote that Koestenbaum "peppers his story with just enough tidbits of fascinating information that readers may fleetingly overlook the fact that his theories are barmy."

Koestenbaum has published many essays, often lyrical or experimental in style, on such subjects as celebrity, classical music, contemporary art, literature, and aesthetics; some of these essays have been collected in the books, Cleavage:  Essays on Sex, Stars, and Aesthetics, and My 1980s & Other Essays, and Figure It Out: Essays.

In 2021, Koestenbaum published his first collection of fables under Semiotext(e) titled, The Cheerful Scapegoat: Fables.

Poetry
Koestenbaum's poetry is often more measured than his criticism.  It frequently comments on itself—on the disorderly process of poetry—as in "Men I Led Astray" (from The Milk of Inquiry):
I haven't said enough about the ragged sun,its satisfaction in being the one to bind my life—to bring the filthy pieces together,on its way to more important tasks.
Koestenbaum's first book, Ode to Anna Moffo and Other Poems, was composed largely in syllabic verse and other fixed forms. In a review of Ode to Anna Moffo and Other Poems for Poetry Magazine, David Baker wrote that "[Koestenbaum] is... willing to exert the pressures of traditional formality, yet he is also likely to let the voice and experience of a poem grate against his own formal gestures..." His subsequent books of poetry took on a more experimental approach to prosody.  He returned to fixed forms for his book-length poem, Model Homes, which is composed in ottava rima. His two most recent books, The Pink Trance Notebooks and Camp Marmalade, are experiments in what Koestenbaum refers to as trance writing. Ben Shields described trance writing in The Paris Review as an approach that "allows language to move freely" and "does not often adhere to expected thematic, syntactic, or logical patterns." Publishers Weekly described the work in The Pink Trance Notebooks as "look[ing] and feel[ing] like the cut-and-paste fragments of a journal."

Painting

Koestenbaum began to paint in 2005 after he finished writing an essay for a group exhibition called "Contemporary Erotic Drawing" at the Aldrich Museum. He has had solo exhibitions at White Columns, the Art Museum at the University of Kentucky in Lexington, and 356 Mission.

In a 2016 Art News article, Ella Coon wrote that "his early work was figurative, and influenced by Warhol. He used a monoprint technique to trace images of male nudes, which he'd originally drawn from life, onto a black ground." In Hyperallergic, his exhibition at the Art Museum at the University of Kentucky in Lexington was described as " all smack of bright, unblended color, sexuality, and a heavy concentration on line and ornamentation — qualities that speak to the artist's admiration for modernists like André Derain, Henri Matisse, and Marsden Hartley."

Performance 
Koestenbaum's first piano and vocal record, Lounge Act, was released in 2017 by Ugly Duckling Presse Records.

He has performed at The Kitchen, REDCAT, Centre Pompidou, The Walker Art Center, and more.

Awards
 2020 American Academy of Arts and Letters Award in Literature
1994 Whiting Award
 1989 Co-winner of Discovery/The Nation Poetry Award

Bibliography

Poetry
Ode to Anna Moffo and Other Poems (Persea, 1990).
Rhapsodies of A Repeat Offender (Persea, 1994).
The Milk of Inquiry (Persea, 1999).
Model Homes (BOA Editions, 2004).
Best-Selling Jewish Porn Films (Turtle Point Press, 2006).
Blue Stranger With Mosaic Background (Turtle Point Press, 2012).
The Pink Trance Notebooks (Nightboat Books, 2015).
Camp Marmalade (Nightboat Books, 2018).

Criticism
 Double Talk: The Erotics of Male Literary Collaboration (Routledge, 1989).
The Queen's Throat: Opera, Homosexuality, and the Mystery of Desire (Poseidon, 1993).
Jackie Under My Skin: Interpreting An Icon (Farrar, Straus, and Giroux, 1995).
Cleavage: Essays on Sex, Stars, and Aesthetics (Ballantine Books, 2000).
Andy Warhol (Lipper/Viking, 2001).
Humiliation (Picador, 2011).
The Anatomy of Harpo Marx (University of California Press, 2012).
My 1980s and Other Essays (Farrar, Straus, and Giroux, 2013)
Notes on Glaze: 18 Photographic Investigations (New York: Cabinet Books, 2016). 
Figure It Out, Essays (Soft Skull Press, 2020).

Fiction
Moira Orfei in Aigues-Mortes (Soft Skull Press, 2004; reprinted as Circus, Soft Skull, 2019).
Hotel Theory (Soft Skull Press, 2007).

Fables 

 The Cheerful Scapegoat: Fables (Semiotext(e), 2021).

Opera libretto
Jackie O

Lyric essay
(The Task of the Translator, Fall 2003)

References

External links
The Graduate Center, CUNY Faculty Page
Interview in Guernica
Interview in Bomb Magazine
Bomb: The Author Interviews Bomb''
Profile at The Whiting Foundation
"Outside In" via Triple Canopy (online magazine)
Interview in Bookforum
Profile in The Face
Profile in Art News
Profile in Hyperallergic
Interview in Boston Review
Wayne Koestenbaum Website
Interview in Frieze

Living people
Writers from New York City
Jewish American writers
American male poets
Jewish American artists
American literary critics
Jewish poets
LGBT Jews
American gay writers
Gay academics
Harvard University alumni
Johns Hopkins University alumni
Princeton University alumni
City University of New York faculty
Graduate Center, CUNY faculty
1958 births
American LGBT poets
American male non-fiction writers
21st-century American Jews
Gay poets